"The Best Year of My Life" is a song co-written and recorded by American country music artist Eddie Rabbitt.  It was released in September 1984 as the second single and title track from the album The Best Year of My Life.  The single was Rabbitt's twelfth number one on the country chart.  The single stayed at number one for one week and spent a total of fourteen weeks on the country chart.  The song was written by Rabbitt and Even Stevens.

Chart performance

References
 

Songs about nostalgia
Eddie Rabbitt songs
1984 singles
Songs written by Eddie Rabbitt
Songs written by Even Stevens (songwriter)
Song recordings produced by Jimmy Bowen
Warner Records singles
1984 songs